"Make 'Em Like You" is a song recorded by Canadian country music singer Dallas Smith. It was written by Tyler Hubbard and Brian Kelley of Florida Georgia Line, along with Cameron Montgomery, Rob Hatch, and Randy Houser.  The song was released to radio by 604 Records as the lead single from his 2019 EP The Fall, and his 2020 album Timeless.

Music video
The music video for "Make 'Em Like You" was directed by Stephano Barberis and premiered September 7, 2018.

Chart performance
"Make 'Em Like You" reached a peak of Number One on the Billboard Canada Country chart dated October 27, 2018. It became Smith's fifth-consecutive Number One hit on the chart, and sixth overall, giving him the record for the most by any Canadian country artist.

Charts

References

2018 songs
2018 singles
Dallas Smith songs
604 Records singles
Songs written by Tyler Hubbard
Song recordings produced by Joey Moi
Songs written by Brian Kelley (musician)
Songs written by Randy Houser
Music videos directed by Stephano Barberis